Thulani Mtsweni (born 31 July 1968) is a South African actor. He is best known for his roles in the popular seriesIsidingo, Isibaya and iNumber Number.

Career
At first, he worked with several student producers to get some exposure in drama due to a struggling pathway towards South African drama. His most notable television acting came through the role as 'Shadrack Bhekiziswe Sibiya' in the popular serial Isidingo. In 2017, he appeared in the television series iNumber Number and played the role 'Nyoka'. He also casts as an abducted boy on Rhythm City. Then he joined the cast of the serial Gomora and quit after two years. In 2020, he joined the cast of another popular telenovela Isibaya and currently playing the role 'Mpihlangene Zungu', younger brother of Mpiyakhe Zungu.

References

External links
 
 Thulani Mtsweni' s new slick & sly character on Isibaya
 Thulani Mtsweni joins cast of Isibaya as Mpihlangene Zungu

Living people
South African television actors
South African actors
South African film actors
1994 births